Scott Jaque-Frederick Pellerin (born January 9, 1970) is a Canadian former professional ice hockey left winger who played in the National Hockey League between 1992 and 2004. Pellerin is currently a NHL scout with the Arizona Coyotes as of 9/28/21.

Playing career

Pellerin was born in Shediac, New Brunswick. He played high school hockey at the Athol Murray College of Notre Dame (a boarding school) in Wilcox, Saskatchewan under coach Barry MacKenzie. In Pellerin's junior year, his midget AAA hockey team took 2nd place in the 1987 Air Canada Cup (the national midget AAA finals). His high school hockey teammates included other future NHLers including Rod Brind'Amour, Jeff Batters, Jason Herter and Joby Messier.  In 1988, Pellerin's senior year, he played for the Hounds junior AA team during its 1st season in the Saskatchewan Junior Hockey League.  That year, the Hounds won the Centennial Cup (the National Junior AA championship) behind goaltender Curtis Joseph.

Pellerin was drafted 47th overall by the New Jersey Devils in the 1989 NHL Entry Draft.  He won the Hobey Baker Award as the best collegiate player in America in 1992 while playing for the University of Maine.  He turned pro in 1992, joined the Devils organization and divided his time between the NHL and the AHL  with the Utica Devils and then the Albany River Rats.  Pellerin signed with the St. Louis Blues in 1996, where he played more ice time.  His best season in the NHL came with the Blues in 1998–99 where in 80 games, he scored 20 goals and 41 points.

In 2000, Pellerin was claimed by the Minnesota Wild in the 2000 NHL Expansion Draft but was traded to the Carolina Hurricanes for the rights of Askhat Rakhmatulin and two draft picks at the trade deadline.  He signed with the Boston Bruins in 2001 but after just one goal in 35 games, he was placed on waivers and eventually claimed by the Dallas Stars. In 2003, he was traded to the Phoenix Coyotes for Claude Lemieux and the rights to Guy Lanouette.  Pellerin re-signed with St. Louis, but only managed two games for the team having been assigned to the AHL's Worcester IceCats. He retired in 2004. In total, Pellerin played 536 regular season games in the NHL, scoring 72 goals and 126 assists for 198 points.

Since 2015, Pellerin has served as the director of player development for the Toronto Maple Leafs of the NHL.  He was promoted to Senior Director of Player Development on August 23, 2018, with Stephane Robidas promoted to take his place.

In 1997, Pellerin was inducted into the University of Maine Hall of Fame and in 2008 he was inducted into the New Brunswick Sports Hall of Fame.

Awards and honors

Career statistics

Regular season and playoffs

International

References

External links

1970 births
Albany River Rats players
Boston Bruins players
Canadian ice hockey left wingers
Carolina Hurricanes players
Dallas Stars players
Hobey Baker Award winners
Ice hockey people from New Brunswick
New Brunswick Sports Hall of Fame inductees
Living people
Maine Black Bears men's ice hockey players
Minnesota Wild players
New Jersey Devils draft picks
New Jersey Devils players
People from Shediac
Phoenix Coyotes players
Portland Pirates players
St. Louis Blues players
Utica Devils players
Worcester IceCats players
AHCA Division I men's ice hockey All-Americans